Major's Hill Park is a park in downtown Ottawa, Ontario.  The park stands above the Rideau Canal at the point where it enters the Ottawa River.  The parliament buildings can be seen across the canal to the west, to the north of the park is the National Gallery of Canada, and to the east are the United States embassy and the Byward Market.  To the south is the Chateau Laurier hotel, built on land that was once part of the park. 

The neighbourhood surrounding the park was once home to those who constructed the canal. In particular, the area that is now the park was the official residence of the Superintending Engineer of the Rideau Canal, Lieutenant-Colonel John By until he returned to England in 1832. The hill was known at the time as "Colonel's Hill".  By was replaced in 1832 by Captain Daniel Bolton who took up residence in By's house.  In 1838 Bolton was promoted to Major.  By the time he left the Bytown in 1843, the hill had become known as Major's Hill. Commemorative plaques and a statue of Lieutenant-Colonel By, Major Bolton and their successors were erected in Major's Hill Park.

The residence was destroyed by fire on October 5, 1848, though ruins survive to today. The use of the area as a residence means that the park has remained a green space since the early days of Ottawa.  It is now managed by the National Capital Commission, which has placed historical information in the northwest corner of the park.

Due to its central location, Major's Hill Park is frequented all year round. It is frequently used as a venue for events, and is central to Ottawa's civic Canada Day celebrations.  A more recent addition to the calendar is the annual 'B In The Park', which precedes the Glengarry Highland Games. Pipe bands and highland dancers from all over the world perform. It is presented by the Sons of Scotland Pipe Band of Ottawa, which claims to be Canada's oldest continuous civilian pipe band.

Evolution of the park

References

External links 

 Bytown Museum page with Hill historical information

Parks in Ottawa